The East Troy Electric Railroad  is an interurban heritage railroad owned and operated by the East Troy Railroad Museum. Passenger excursions run on a  stretch of track from East Troy to Mukwonago, Wisconsin.

History 
The line dates back to 1907, when it was a part of The Milwaukee Electric Railway and Light Company line from East Troy to Milwaukee.

The East Troy-Mukwonago segment was purchased by the Village of East Troy in 1939, when the remainder of the line to Hales Corners was abandoned. Under terms of the purchase, it was operated by TMER&L crews for ten years. In 1949, TMER&L declined to renew the agreement for another ten years and the village hired its own crew and operated the railroad from 1950 until 1985. This is when the railroad became the Municipality of East Troy Wisconsin Railroad and adopted the reporting symbol METW. In 1985 the village approached the Wisconsin Trolley Museum and asked them to take over the operation of the railroad. They agreed to do so, and moved their collection of trolleys to East Troy.

Museum operations began over the line as early as 1967 when The Wisconsin Electric Railway Historical Society (TWERHS) relocated its collection of electric railway equipment from North Freedom, Wisconsin, to East Troy. TWERHS operated over the line using a trackage rights agreement with the village until 1984, when the trackage rights agreement ended and the Wisconsin Trolley Museum began to operate the line as the East Troy Electric Railroad. The Friends of East Troy Railroad Museum, Inc. purchased the rail line from the village and also purchased the trolley collection of Paul Averdung between 1995 and 2000 in stages.

Current operation 
The original substation building in East Troy, Wisconsin, is used as a ticket office and museum, and visitors can purchase rides to the Elegant Farmer store at Phantom Woods, and to Indianhead Park in Mukwonago. A collection of approximately 30 pieces of electric railway equipment is kept in storage barns in downtown East Troy and at Phantom Woods. The museum is a 501(c)(3) non-profit educational corporation run by volunteers. The substation, located at 2002 Church Street in East Troy, is on the National Register of Historic Places.

Route description 

The railway itself is a standard gauge common carrier railroad that operates in interchange with Canadian National Railway (formerly a connection to Wisconsin Central Ltd.). This gives the East Troy electric railroad the ability to pick up and deliver freight (including fertilizer for the Farmers Co-op, sand for the local Ready-Mix, and lumber and steel tubing) to the village of East Troy. However, the railroad has not been used to carry freight for at least ten years.

Much of the track is original and the railbed was refurbished during the mid-1990s. The line is completely electric, utilizing a 600 V direct current system. Power is supplied to trolleys and interurban railroad cars through overhead wires. The original 500 kW rotary converter motor-generator is no longer used and is on display at the museum.

Notable equipment

Gallery

See also 
 John I. Beggs

References

External links 

 
 The Wisconsin Electric Railway Historical Society, Inc.

Heritage railroads in Wisconsin
Museums in Walworth County, Wisconsin
Interurban railways in Wisconsin
Heritage streetcar systems
Railroad museums in Wisconsin
Electric railways in Wisconsin
Street railway museums in the United States
600 V DC railway electrification